Cochylimorpha thomasi is a species of moth of the family Tortricidae. It is found in Turkey.

References

Moths described in 2003
Cochylimorpha
Moths of Asia